Peoria Stadium could mean:

 Peoria Sports Complex, Peoria, Arizona — a 1994 baseball stadium with practice fields
 Peoria Public Schools Stadium, Peoria, Illinois — a football stadium on U.S. Route 150